Eugen Wiesberger Jr. (30 December 1933 – 2 May 1996) was an Austrian wrestler. He competed at the 1956 Summer Olympics, the 1960 Summer Olympics and the 1964 Summer Olympics.

References

1933 births
1996 deaths
Austrian male sport wrestlers
Olympic wrestlers of Austria
Wrestlers at the 1956 Summer Olympics
Wrestlers at the 1960 Summer Olympics
Wrestlers at the 1964 Summer Olympics
Sportspeople from Linz